Lagoa Nova (lit. "New Pond") is a municipality of Rio Grande do Norte state in the Northeast of Brazil.

References

 
1964 establishments in Brazil
Populated places established in 1964
Municipalities in Rio Grande do Norte